Liu Yongli (born 28 June 1980) is a road cyclist from China. She represented her nation at the 2006 and 2007 UCI Road World Championships.

References

External links
 profile at Procyclingstats.com

1980 births
Chinese female cyclists
Living people
Place of birth missing (living people)